Dilshat Kidirhan (born January 1966) is a Chinese politician of Kyrgyz ethnicity who is the current governor of Kizilsu Kyrgyz Autonomous Prefecture and vice chairman of the Xinjiang Regional Committee of the Chinese People's Political Consultative Conference. He joined the Chinese Communist Party in December 1988, and entered the workforce in July 1990. He is a delegate to the 13th National People's Congress.

Early life and education
Dilshat Kidirhan was born in Tekes County, Xinjiang, January 1966. In September 1984, he was accepted to Xinjiang Normal University, majoring in Chinese language and literature. After graduation, he was admitted to Northwest A&F University, where he majored in agricultural economic management.

Career
Dilshat Kidirhan worked in the Animal Husbandry Department of Xinjiang Uygur Autonomous Region after university, and was assigned to the Investment Promotion and Development Bureau of Xinjiang Uygur Autonomous Region in January 2011. In April 2015, he was admitted to member of the standing committee of the CCP Kizilsu Kyrgyz Autonomous Prefectural Committee, the prefecture's top authority. In June 2016, he was named acting governor of Kizilsu Kyrgyz Autonomous Prefecture, concurrently serving as vice chairman of the Xinjiang Regional Committee of the Chinese People's Political Consultative Conference since February 2021.

References

1966 births
Living people
People from Tekes County
Chinese people of Kyrgyzstani descent
Xinjiang Normal University alumni
Northwest A&F University alumni
People's Republic of China politicians from Xinjiang
Chinese Communist Party politicians from Xinjiang
Delegates to the 13th National People's Congress
Governors of Kizilsu Kyrgyz Autonomous Prefecture